The 1996–97 English Premiership (known as the Courage League National 1 for sponsorship reasons) was the tenth season of the top flight of rugby union in England. It was the first professional season in English rugby union history. 

The league was made up of twelve teams with each team playing each other twice, in a round robin system. 

Wasps were the champions, with a winning margin of six points above Bath, the runners–up. West Hartlepool and Orrell were relegated to National Division 2. It was the tenth and final season of sponsorship by Courage.

Participating teams

Table

Results
The home team is listed in the left column.

Relegation/Promotion playooffs
For the first time playooffs took place between the third and fourth placed teams in Division Two and the ninth and tenth placed teams in Division One. The play-offs followed a 4th v 9th, 3rd v 10th system. The matches were played over two legs, with the second-tier team playing at home in the first leg.

First leg

Second leg

Bristol won 39–23 on aggregate.

London Irish won 42–23 on aggregate.

References

External links
Official website

Premiership Rugby seasons
 
English